"All rights reserved" is a phrase that originated in copyright law as part of copyright notices. It indicates that the copyright holder reserves, or holds for their own use, all the rights provided by copyright law, such as distribution, performance, and creation of derivative works; that is, they have not waived any such right. Copyright law in most countries no longer requires such notices, but the phrase persists. The original understanding of the phrase as relating specifically to copyright may have been supplanted by common usage of the phrase to refer to any legal right, although it is probably understood to refer at least to copyright. 

In the past, the phrase was required as a result of the Buenos Aires Convention of 1910 which mandated that some statement of reservation of rights be made in order to secure protection in signatory countries of the convention. It was required to add the phrase as a written notice that all rights granted under existing copyright law (such as the right to publish a work within a specific area) were retained by the copyright holder and that legal action might be taken against infringement.

Since copyright law is neither straightforward nor widely understood in its details, nor is the Buenos Aires Convention's previous requirement and current deprecation of the phrase common lay knowledge, the phrase continues to hold popular currency and serve as a handy convention widely used by artists, writers, and content creators to prevent ambiguity and clearly spell out the warning that their content cannot be copied freely. it is unclear if it has any legal effect in any jurisdiction. However, it is still used by many copyright holders.

Origins 
The phrase originated as a result of the Buenos Aires Convention of 1910. Article 3 of the Convention granted copyright in all signatory countries to a work registered in any signatory country, as long as a statement "that indicates the reservation of the property right" (emphasis added) appeared in the work. The phrase "all rights reserved" was not specified in the text, but met this requirement.

Other copyright treaties did not require this formality. For example, in 1952 the Universal Copyright Convention (UCC) adopted the © symbol as an indicator of protection. (The symbol was introduced in the US by a 1954 amendment to the Copyright Act of 1909.) The Berne Convention rejected formalities altogether in Article 4 of the 1908 revision, so authors seeking to protect their works in countries that had signed on to the Berne Convention were also not required to use the "all rights reserved" formulation. However, because not all Buenos Aires signatories were members of Berne or the UCC, and in particular the United States did not join UCC until 1955, a publisher in a Buenos Aires signatory seeking to protect a work in the greatest number of countries between 1910 and 1952 would have used both the phrase "all rights reserved" and the copyright symbol.

Obsolescence 
The requirement to add the "all rights reserved" notice became essentially obsolete on August 23, 2000, when Nicaragua became the final member of the Buenos Aires Convention to also become a signatory to the Berne Convention. As of that date, every country that was a member of the Buenos Aires Convention (which is the only copyright treaty requiring this notice to be used) was also a member of Berne, which requires protection be granted without any formality of notice of copyright.

The phrase continues to hold popular currency in spite of having no legal effect.

Translations 
There are many translations for this phrase with the equivalent term in:
  Afrikaans – Alle regte voorbehou
  Arabic – جميع الحقوق محفوظة
  Basque – Eskubide guztiak erreserbatuta.
  Bengali – সর্বস্বত্ব সংরক্ষিত
  Bulgarian – Всички права запазени.
  Catalan – Tots els drets reservats.
  Chinese – 版權所有。
  Croatian – Sva prava pridržana.
  Czech – Všechna práva vyhrazena.
  Danish – Alle rettigheder forbeholdes.
  Dutch – Alle rechten voorbehouden.
  Estonian – Kõik õigused kaitstud.
  Finnish – Kaikki oikeudet pidätetään.
  Filipino - Nakareserba ang lahat ng karapatan.
  French – Tous droits réservés.
  German – Alle Rechte vorbehalten.
  Georgian – ყველა უფლება დაცულია.
  Greek – Με επιφύλαξη παντός δικαιώματος.
  Hebrew – .כל הזכויות שמורות
  Hindi – सर्वाधिकार सुरक्षित.
  Hungarian – Minden jog fenntartva.
  Icelandic – Öll réttindi áskilin.
  Indonesian – Hak cipta dilindungi undang-undang.
  Italian – Tutti i Diritti Riservati.
  Japanese – 著作権を所有します。
  Korean – 모든 권리 보유 or even 모든 권리가 인정됨.
  Latvian – Visas tiesības aizsargātas.
  Lithuanian – Visos teisės saugomos.
  Malay – Hak Cipta Terpelihara.
  Norwegian – Alle rettigheter er forbeholdt.
  Papiamento – Tur derecho reserva
  Persian – تمامی حقوق محفوظ است.
  Polish – Wszelkie prawa zastrzeżone.
  Portuguese – Todos os Direitos Reservados.
  Romanian – Toate drepturile rezervate.
  Russian – Все права защищены (“All rights protected”); some use the more accurate: “Все права сохранены”.
  Scots – Aw richts is pitten by.
  Serbian – Сва права задржана.
  Slovak – Všetky práva vyhradené.
  Slovenian – Vse pravice pridržane.
  Spanish – Todos los derechos reservados. Often abbreviated as D.R.
  Swedish – Med ensamrätt. or even Eftertryck förbjudes. or even Alla rättigheter förbehålles.
  Tamil – அனைத்து உரிமைகளும் பாதுகாக்கப்பட்டவை.
  Thai – จำกัด ขอสงวนสิทธิ์ทั้งหมด.
  Turkish – Tüm Hakları Saklıdır.
  Ukrainian – Всі права захищено.
  Urdu – جملہ حقوق محفوظ ہیں
  Vietnamese – Giữ toàn quyền. or Mọi quyền được bảo lưu. or Bảo lưu toàn quyền.
  Zulu – Wonke amalungelo agodliwe.

See also 

Copyright formalities
Copyright notice
Creative Commons, which uses Some rights reserved.
Public domain

References 

English phrases
Copyright law
Copyright law legal terminology